Bobby Hannah was a Scottish professional football defender who played for Aberdeen.

Hannah signed for Aberdeen in 1908 from local club East End, but made his debut in 1911. His career was interrupted while he served in the First World War, but he returned to Aberdeen in 1919. He played for Peterhead after leaving Aberdeen in 1921, then went on to play in the USA.

References

Year of death missing
Association football defenders
Scottish footballers
Aberdeen F.C. players
Scottish Football League players
Year of birth missing
Aberdeen East End F.C. players